Tetragnatha nitens is a species of long-jawed orb weaver in the spider family Tetragnathidae. It is found in Asia, has been introduced into the Americas, Madeira, Canary Islands, Europe, Egypt, Madagascar, Pacific islands, and New Zealand.

Taxonomy 
It was first described as Eugnatha nitens  in 1826 by Jean Victor Audouin, and was transferred to the genus, Tetragnatha, in 1841 by Charles Athanase Walckenaer. The specific epithet, nitens, describes the spider as "shining" (brillante).

References

External links

 

Articles created by Qbugbot
Spiders described in 1826
Tetragnathidae